Apley Forge is a village in Shropshire, England, north of the town of Bridgnorth.

External links

Villages in Shropshire